Otis Taylor may refer to:
Otis Taylor (American football) (1942–2023), American football player
Otis Taylor (musician) (born 1948), blues musician